La Boissière-d'Ans (Occitan language: La Boissiera d'Ans) is a former commune in the Dordogne department in southwestern France. On 1 January 2017, it was merged into the new commune Cubjac-Auvézère-Val d'Ans.

Geography
Its principal river is the Blâme.

Population

International relations
La Boissière-d'Ans is twinned with:
 Ans, Belgium, since 1999

See also
Communes of the Dordogne département

References

Former communes of Dordogne